Wojciech Reszko (born 30 October 1956) is a Polish judoka. He competed in the men's heavyweight event at the 1980 Summer Olympics.

References

External links
 

1956 births
Living people
Polish male judoka
Olympic judoka of Poland
Judoka at the 1980 Summer Olympics
Sportspeople from Szczecin